Birau may refer to:
 Birau (boat), a small dugout canoe of the Sama-Bajau people
 Kampong Birau, village in Tutong District, Brunei